Jobbie Nooner is the second largest boat party in the Midwest, after The Raft Off at nearby Muscamoot Bay, and one of the largest boat parties in America. It takes place around Gull Island in Lake Saint Clair, Michigan.

According to co-creator Jack Campbell, "The very first Jobbie Nooner occurred Friday, June 28th, 1974."

Auto workers, who called themselves "Jobbies", would take the last Friday in June off work to party at Gull Island (Lake St. Clair, Michigan). The event was originally timed to coincide with the birthday of Lee Wagner, the event's other co-creator, but eventually grew to become a bigger celebration.

The party now occurs twice a year. Jobbie Nooner is the last Friday in June and Jobbie Nooner Two is the first Saturday after Labor Day.

References

External links
"Exclusive interview with Lee O'Dell, Co Creator of Jobbie Nooner""From JobbieCrew.com"
"Exclusive interview with Billy Fritts, Original promoter of Jobbie Nooner""From JobbieCrew.com"
 "For official story of Jobbie Nooner", January 1, 2015 - Lake St. Clair Guide Magazine 2015 Edition
"Official 2015 dates" "For official dates, pictures and more information about Jobbie Nooner"
"10,000 boaters party at Jobbie Nooner", The Detroit News, June 26, 2010.
"Jobbie Nooner 2010 draws thousands of boats", Detroit Free Press, June 25, 2010
"Jobbie Nooner 2010 a party to remember", Providing News

Michigan culture
Metro Detroit
Culture of Detroit
Tourist attractions in Oakland County, Michigan
Lake St. Clair